The Ewigschneehorn is a mountain of the Bernese Alps, located between the valleys of the Unterar and Gauli Glacier, east of the Schreckhorn. It has an elevation of 3,329 metres above sea level. The mountain is entirely surrounded by glaciers.

References

External links
Ewigschneehorn on Hikr

Bernese Alps
Mountains of the Alps
Alpine three-thousanders
Mountains of Switzerland
Mountains of the canton of Bern